Joachim "Jochen" Balke (September 12, 1917 – MIA January 19, 1944) was a German breaststroke swimmer who won a gold medal at the 1938 London European Championship and competed in the 1936 Summer Olympics.

He was born in Dortmund and died during World War II.

In 1936 he finished sixth in the 200 metre breaststroke event.
In 1938 he finished first at the European Championship in London in the 200 m breaststroke event.

References

1917 births
1944 deaths
Sportspeople from Dortmund
German male swimmers
Olympic swimmers of Germany
Swimmers at the 1936 Summer Olympics
German military personnel killed in World War II
Missing in action of World War II
European Aquatics Championships medalists in swimming
People declared dead in absentia
Missing person cases in Russia
People with post-traumatic stress disorder
German male breaststroke swimmers
20th-century German people